Discharge by purchase, colloquially called buying oneself out of service, is the obtaining of a military discharge by payment. The purchase price is in effect a fine for leaving military service earlier than the date contracted for when enlisting.  pertains to voluntary enlistment; "exemption by purchase" is a similar privilege pertaining to conscription. In the United States military, discharge by purchase was introduced in 1890 for the Army, 1902 for the Marine Corps and 1906 for the Navy. It was abolished in 1953. In the Irish Defence Forces, it is permitted under the Defence Act 1954. Discharge by purchase was typically suspended during wartime. In the British Armed Forces, it was suspended in 1950 during the Korean War and reintroduced in 1953; accepting an application for such a discharge was at the discretion of the commanding officer.

References

Conscription
Military life
Termination of employment
Payments